A Starr revolver (Starr DA) is a double-action revolver which was used in the western theater of the American Civil War until the United States Army Ordnance Department persuaded the Starr Arms Co. to create a single-action variant after discontinuation of the Colt. The company eventually complied, and the Union acquired 25,000 of the single-action revolvers for $12 each. However, the price paid by the government for the DA army revolver was $25.  The State of Ohio purchased 500 of the .36 Caliber Navy version for $20 each.

Power and charge
The Starr DA .44 cylinder holds in each chamber  of powder, the bullet weighs .

Three variations
Starr received patent number 30843 on December 4, 1860 for the DA revolver.

Starr patent:

Generally there are three models of Starr revolvers:
1858 Double Action .36 Caliber Percussion Navy Revolver (produced 1859-1860) [3000 produced] 
1858 Double Action .44 Caliber Percussion Army Revolver (produced 1862-1863) [~23000 produced]
1863 Single Action .44 Caliber Percussion Army Revolver (produced 1863-1864) [23000 produced]

In total, 47,454 Starr revolvers were manufactured making it the third most issued of civil war era revolvers (6,352 Starr DA Navy and Army revolvers were purchased on the open market).

Other double-action percussion revolvers
The most widely known double-action percussion revolver is likely the First Model Adams of 1851. This was unique in having a double-action-only mechanism, a cylinder that could quickly be removed by pulling forward on the front of the cylinder pin and slightly tapered cylinders designed to take either proprietary combustible cartridges with a conical bullet designed to fit the tapered cylinder or a round ball. No ramrod was provided. Another unique feature was a safety catch which held the hammer away from the percussion cap under it so it could be carried with all its 5 cylinders loaded unlike the Colt in which one of its 6 cylinders was left uncapped while carried because the hammer would rest on it which could result in a discharge if dropped. An improved version of this is the Beaumont–Adams of 1855 which has a hammer spur and a mechanism which allows single-or double-action operation. The cartridge idea had proved unpopular, so the cylinders were bored parallel for use with ball and powder and a ramrod installed on the left side of the barrel. The Beaumont–Adams differs from the Starr DA in that it is configured for a SA/DA mode. Some sources claim that Starr and Beaumont did not produce enough revolvers to be considered major players in the market.  These sources claim that the first widely used DA revolver (sometimes called the first "modern" revolver) was the Colt M1889 .38 Government (.38 Long Colt) used by the Navy, and/or the improved version for the Navy and Army, the Colt M1892, because, despite wide adoption, the 1889 model was produced in relatively low numbers.

Pietta replica
For a time, the Pietta company manufactured a modern-day replica of the Starr double-action and single-action models.  Aficionados generally consider the replica to be of lower overall quality than the original.

Cultural reference

The Starr DA is featured in the 1992 film Unforgiven, when William Munny (Clint Eastwood) takes it from its case to determine whether he has lost his former shooting ability. The self-cocking trigger can be seen in this film.  In the 1994 film Wyatt Earp young Wyatt Earp (Kevin Costner) carries this gun.

This gun is shown in its case in the 1982 film First Blood.

References

External links
Compare between original and replica revolvers

Early revolvers
Eban Starr design
American Civil War weapons
Guns of the American West
Black-powder pistols